is Gundam SEED Destiny counterpart to Gundam SEED: Special Edition. It is a four-part compilation movie.

Overview

Like the three specials of Gundam SEED, these specials feature new or changed scenes of the TV series. However unlike the TV series, which was told in the points of view of main characters Shinn Asuka and Kira Yamato, the Special Edition was told through the eyes of Athrun Zala, giving the movies a much more neutral point of view.
The DVD quartet, as opposed to the series, seems to put much more emphasis on Shinn's romantic relationship with Lunamaria Hawke and much less emphasis on Lunamaria's prior crush on Athrun so that fans could see a much easier transition from Shinn being romantically involved with Stella Loussier to Lunamaria, rather than in the series, which just had it as a sudden occurrence.

Broadcast on Japanese TV
First special, "The Shattered World" (covers episodes 1 to 13 of the series), aired in two parts on May 2 and May 3, 2006.
Second special, "Their Respective Swords" (covers episodes 14 to 28 of the series), aired in two parts on July 27 and July 28, 2006.
Third special, "Flames of Destiny" (covers episodes 29 to 42 of the series), aired on October 8, 2006.
Fourth special, "The Cost of Freedom" (covers episodes 43 to 50 of the series and the "Final  Plus" episode, "The Chosen Future"), aired on February 23, 2007.

Ending and insert songs

Ending songs (in order)
"Result" by Nami Tamaki
"Tears" by lisa
"Enrai (Tooku ni Aru Akari)" by HIGH and MIGHTY COLOR
 by See-Saw

Insert songs
"Fields of hope" by Rie Tanaka (Special Edition I, IV)
 (partial) by Rie Tanaka (Special Edition I)
"Zips (UNDER:COVER version)" by T.M.Revolution (Special Edition I)
"EMOTION" by Rie Tanaka (Special Edition II)
 by T.M.Revolution (Special Edition II)
 by Houko Kuwashima (Special Edition III)
 by T.M.Revolution (Special Edition III-IV)

References

External links

2006 anime films
2007 anime films
Bandai Entertainment anime titles
SEED Destiny Special
Japanese animated films
Mobile Suit Gundam SEED
Shōnen manga
Sunrise (company)
Films scored by Toshihiko Sahashi